Glen Robert Christiansen (born 10 February 1957) is a former Swedish Olympic swimmer. He competed in the 1980 Summer Olympics, where he finished 11th in the 200 m breaststroke.

Since then he has had continued success as a Masters swimmer and has pursued an international career as a swimming coach.

2013 accident and recovery
In February 2013 he suffered a fall down a flight of stairs whilst in Tenerife, fracturing his skull from ear to ear. He was flown to Hamburg and kept in an induced coma for three weeks. Within six months he had recovered sufficiently to compete successfully in a  open water race in the river Elbe outside of Hamburg

Clubs
 Göteborgs KK Najaden
 S02 Göteborg
 SOIK Hellas
 MASS
 SK Neptun
 SG Hamburg
 Hamburger Schwimm Club
 Mainichi Masters
 The Oahu Club
 USG Copenhagen
 Göteborg Sim

Publications

References

External links
 

1957 births
Swedish male breaststroke swimmers
Living people
Swimmers at the 1980 Summer Olympics
Olympic swimmers of Sweden
European Aquatics Championships medalists in swimming
Swimmers from Gothenburg
20th-century Swedish people
21st-century Swedish people